Allen Parish is a parish located in the U.S. state of Louisiana. As of the 2020 census, the population was 22,750. The parish seat is Oberlin and the largest city is Oakdale. Allen Parish is in southwestern Louisiana, southwest of Alexandria.

Allen Parish is named for former Confederate States Army general and Governor of Louisiana Henry Watkins Allen. It was separated in 1912 from the larger Calcasieu Parish to the southwest.

Leatherwood Museum

On September 27, 2008, the Allen Parish Tourist Commission opened Leatherwood Museum in Oakdale in a two-story house which served during the early 20th century as a hospital where women waited on the second-floor balcony to deliver their babies.

The museum focuses on the history of agriculture and timber.

Geography

Major highways
  U.S. Highway 165
  U.S. Highway 190
  Louisiana Highway 10
  Louisiana Highway 26

Adjacent parishes
 Vernon Parish  (northwest)
 Rapides Parish  (northeast)
 Evangeline Parish  (east)
 Jefferson Davis Parish  (south)
 Beauregard Parish  (west)

Waterways
 Bundick Creek
 Calcasieu River
 Ouiski Chitto Creek
 Six Mile Creek
 Ten Mile Creek

Demographics

2020 census

As of the 2020 United States census, there were 22,750 people, 7,925 households, and 5,566 families residing in the parish.

2000 census
As of the census of 2000, there were 25,440 people, 8,102 households, and 5,930 families residing in the parish.  The population density was 33 people per square mile (13/km2).  There were 9,157 housing units at an average density of 12 per square mile (5/km2).  The racial makeup of the parish was 71.90% White, 24.60% Black or African American, 1.72% Native American, 0.57% Asian, 0.01% Pacific Islander, 0.24% from other races, and 0.96% from two or more races.  4.50% of the population were Hispanic or Latino of any race. 6.22% reported speaking French or Cajun French at home, while 4.68% speak Spanish.

There were 8,102 households, out of which 36.90% had children under the age of 18 living with them, 54.00% were married couples living together, 15.20% had a female householder with no husband present, and 26.80% were non-families. 24.30% of all households were made up of individuals, and 11.10% had someone living alone who was 65 years of age or older.  The average household size was 2.62 and the average family size was 3.12.

In the parish the population was spread out, with 24.60% under the age of 18, 9.30% from 18 to 24, 33.40% from 25 to 44, 20.80% from 45 to 64, and 11.80% who were 65 years of age or older.  The median age was 35 years. For every 100 females there were 126.40 males.  For every 100 females age 18 and over, there were 133.50 males.

The median income for a household in the parish was $27,777, and the median income for a family was $33,920. Males had a median income of $32,371 versus $17,154 for females. The per capita income for the parish was $13,101.  About 17.90% of families and 19.90% of the population were below the poverty line, including 22.60% of those under age 18 and 21.50% of those age 65 or over.

The most populated city as of the 2000 census was Oakdale, LA.

Politics
Allen was a strongly Democratic parish in Presidential and Congressional elections; the last Republican to win a majority in the parish before 2000 was Richard Nixon in 1972. Starting in 2000, when George W. Bush narrowly won the parish, Allen has become a Republican stronghold; John McCain won nearly two-thirds of the parish's vote in 2008.

Allen is part of Louisiana's 4th congressional district, held by Republican Mike Johnson. In the Louisiana House of Representatives Allen is part of the 32nd  district, held by Republican R. DeWitt Carrier. In the Louisiana Senate Allen is part of the 28th district, held by Republican Heather Cloud.

Education
Residents are zoned to Allen Parish Schools

It is in the service area of Sowela Technical Community College.

National Guard
Detachment 1, B Company 3-156TH Infantry Battalion of the 256TH IBCT resided in Oakdale, Louisiana.  This unit deployed twice to Iraq in 2004-5 and 2010. Armory was closed, elements moved to Camp Beauregard.

Communities

City 
 Oakdale (largest municipality)

Towns 
 Elizabeth
 Kinder
 Oberlin (parish seat)

Village 
 Reeves

Unincorporated communities 

 Bel
 Bernard
 Bond
 Canton
 Cherry Grove
 Coverdale (also in Jefferson Davis Parish)
 Elder
 Grant
 Lauderdale
 Le Blanc
 Mittie

Notable people
 Hoyle Granger (1944-), former American football player in the NFL. Member of the Mississippi Sports Hall of Fame and Louisiana Sports Hall of Fame
 William J. "Bill" Dodd (1909–1991), Louisiana lieutenant governor from 1948-1952 and Louisiana state representative from 1940-1948
 Faye Emerson (1917-1983), film and stage actress and television interviewer
 Gilbert Franklin Hennigan (1883-1960), Louisiana state senator from 1944 to 1956.
 Dorothy Sue Hill (1939-), rancher and retired educator. Former Louisiana state representative for the 32nd District.
 E. Holman Jones (1926-2014), United States Navy veteran of World War II and Louisiana state representative from 1968-1972
 Coleman Lindsey (1892–1968), Louisiana state senator from 1924-1928 and 1932-1939. Lieutenant Governor of Louisiana from 1939-1940
 Mary Evelyn Parker (1920-2015), first female Treasurer of Louisiana from 1968-1987
 Douglas B. Fournet (1943-1968), posthumous recipient of the Medal of Honor during the Vietnam War
Leroy Johnson (1919-1944), posthumous recipient of the Medal of Honor during World War II
 Beau Jocque (1953-1999), Louisiana French Creole zydeco musician and songwriter
 Blake Trahan (1993-), former professional baseball shortstop with the Cincinnati Reds
 Roy Brown (1925-1981), R&B singer, songwriter, and musician
 R.C. Slocum (1944-), former head football coach at Texas A&M

See also
 National Register of Historic Places listings in Allen Parish, Louisiana

References

External links
 
 
 Allen Parish Sheriff's Office

Geology
 Heinrich, P. V., J. Snead, and R. P. McCulloh, 2002, Lake Charles 30 x 60 minute geologic quadrangle. Louisiana Geological Survey, Baton Rouge, Louisiana.
 Heinrich, P. V., J. Snead, and R. P. McCulloh, 2003, Crowley 30 x 60 minute geologic quadrangle. Louisiana Geological Survey, Baton Rouge, Louisiana.
 Snead, J., P. V. Heinrich, and R. P. McCulloh, 2002a, Ville Platte 30 x 60 minute geologic quadrangle. Louisiana Geological Survey, Baton Rouge, Louisiana.
 Snead, J., P. V. Heinrich, and R. P. McCulloh, 2002b, De Ridder 30 x 60 minute geologic quadrangle. Louisiana Geological Survey, Baton Rouge, Louisiana.

 
Louisiana parishes
1912 establishments in Louisiana
Populated places established in 1912
Parishes in Central Louisiana